The 2019 IMSA SportsCar Championship was the 49th motor racing championship sanctioned by the International Motor Sports Association (IMSA) (which traces its lineage back to the 1971 IMSA GT Championship). It was the sixth season of the United SportsCar Championship and fourth to be held under the name as the WeatherTech SportsCar Championship. It began on January 26 with the 24 Hours of Daytona, and ended on October 12 with the Petit Le Mans. The 2019 season marked the 50th anniversary since the founding of the International Motor Sports Association.

Series news 
 NBC Sports Group took over from Fox Sports as the series' official broadcaster. Coverage alternates between local NBC stations, NBC Sports Network, CNBC, and livestreams.
 Michelin increased its IMSA involvement by becoming the sole official tire supplier of the series, following the departure of Continental Tire at the end of 2018.
 As part of a plan to attempt to cut costs for the series' GT Daytona (GTD) class, the 2019 season featured a new support championship called the WeatherTech Sprint Cup. The championship was held for the GT Daytona class at the sprint events of the calendar.
 After an eleven-year partnership, Tequila Patrón ended their involvement with IMSA altogether at the end of the 2018 season. They also ended their sponsorship of the Extreme Speed Motorsports prototype team, who subsequently closed down operations. Michelin took Patrón's place as the sponsor of the endurance cup.
 As part of the celebration of the 50th anniversary of IMSA, multiple teams adopted racing liveries created in tribute to iconic teams throughout IMSA's history, such as Brumos Porsche, Electramotive Engineering, Roush Racing, and Comptech Acura.

Classes

 Daytona Prototype international (DPi)
 Le Mans Prototype 2 (LMP2)
 GT Le Mans (GTLM)
 GT Daytona (GTD)

The Prototype class, which previously combined Daytona Prototype International cars alongside Le Mans Prototype LMP2 cars, was now split into two separate classes.

Rule changes 
 The DPi class is now the lead class of the championship, and features teams with full professional lineups running DPi cars. The class has its own Balance of Performance (BoP). The LMP2 class is the lower prototype class in the championship, featuring Global LMP2 cars with Pro-Am lineups. There is no BoP applied to the LMP2 class.
 Le Mans Prototype 2 (LMP2) and GT Daytona (GTD), the Pro-Am classes of the championship, must adhere to driver rating requirements. Each car is only allowed two Platinum-rated or Gold-rated drivers for the endurance events, alongside the requirement of at least one Bronze-rated or Silver-rated driver for all sprint races. In these classes, the Bronze or Silver-rated drivers are required to start the race.

Schedule

The 2019 schedule was released on August 3, 2018 and features twelve rounds.

Notes

Entries

Daytona Prototype international (DPi)

Le Mans Prototype 2 (LMP2) 

In accordance with the 2017 LMP2 regulations, all cars in the LMP2 class use the Gibson GK428 V8 engine.

GT Le Mans (GTLM)

 
WeatherTech SportsCar Championship seasons
WeatherTech SportsCar Championship